Racconigi  is a town and comune in Piedmont, Italy.

History
The town was founded in medieval times. It was a possession of the marquisses of Saluzzo, of the princes of Acaia and of the Savoy-Carignano.

On 24 October 1909 King Victor Emmanuel III of Italy and Nicholas II of Russian Empire concluded a secret agreement at Racconigi, known as the Racconigi Bargain.

Geography
Racconigi is located in the northern borders of its province with the Metropolitan City of Turin.  The town borders with the municipalities of Caramagna Piemonte, Carmagnola (TO), Casalgrasso, Cavallerleone, Cavallermaggiore, Lombriasco (TO), Murello, Polonghera and Sommariva del Bosco. Its municipal hamlets (frazioni) are Berroni, Canapile, Migliabruna Nuova, Migliabruna Vecchia, Oia, Parruccia, San Lorenzo, Streppe, Tagliata.

Economy
The economy is mostly based on agriculture, production of milk and meat, and industrial working of metal sheets.

Main sights

Castle of Racconigi: This royal residence built in 1570 on the basis of an earlier castle which dated to the beginning of the second millennium. The large park was laid out in 1755 by the French gardener Molard from designs by Le Nôtre, and enlarged in 1835. The castle became the summer residence of the King of Italy in 1901, and part of the World Heritage Site Residences of the Royal House of Savoy in 1997.
San Giovanni Battista: Church
San Domenico: Baroque church 
Santa Maria Maggiore: Baroque church
Church of Santissimo Nome di Gesù: Baroque churchLIPU'': the Italian League for the Protection of Birds, established the Centro Anatidi e Cicogne in 1985 in a large farmhouse near the castle as a site for the reintroduction of the white stork, which became extinct in Italy as a breeding species at the beginning of the eighteenth century.  The site now includes a breeding centre for various endangered species of ducks, geese and swans—notably the white-headed duck which has been extinct in Italy since 1976—and an area of wetland where visitors can observe such migrants as black-winged stilt, little ringed plover and black-tailed godwit.
Tenuta Berroni: The estate was built in 1773 for the noble De Laugier as holiday house with beautiful gardens, a chapel and some rural buildings: it was an isolated villa in the countryside, but made entirely self-sufficient. The interior decoration and antique furniture were commissioned to the many artists who worked for Castle of Racconigi. Today it is both a private estate as well as a location for weddings, events and a set for several movies.

Notable people
 Francesco Imberti, archbishop of Vercelli.
 Umberto II, last King of Italy, was born here.

Twin towns
  Bonneville (France) (1990)
  Cascais (Portugal) (2003)

References

External links

 Il Castello di Racconigi 
 Centro Anatidi e Cicogne 

Cities and towns in Piedmont
Nature reserves in Italy